The 1945 Army Cadets football team was an American football powerhouse that represented the United States Military Academy as an independent and considered to be among the greatest in collegiate history.

In their fifth season under head coach Earl "Red" Blaik, the Cadets compiled a 9–0 record, shut out five of nine opponents (including a 48–0 victory over No. 2 Notre Dame and a 61–0 victory over No. 6 Penn), and outscored all opponents by a total of 412 to 46. Army's 1945 season was part of a 32-game undefeated streak that included the entire 1944, 1945, and 1946 seasons.

In the final AP Poll released on December 2, Army was ranked No. 1 nationally with 1,160 points, more than 200 points ahead of No. 2 Navy. All seven other contemporary major selectors also recognized Army as the 1945 national champion, including the Boand System, Dunkel System, DeVold System, Houlgate System, Litkenhous, Poling System, and Williamson System. Army also garnered six retrospective selections by later major selectors (two also selected a co-champion): Berryman (QPRS), Billingsley Report, College Football Researchers Association, Helms Athletic Foundation, National Championship Foundation, and Sagarin Ratings. Army also won the Lambert Trophy as the best football team in the east.

The team led the nation with an average of 462.7 yards of total offense per game, including 359.8 rushing yards per game. The offense was led by backs Doc Blanchard and Glenn Davis. Blanchard scored 114 points in 1945 and received both the Heisman Trophy and the Maxwell Award as the best player in college football. Davis rushed for 944 yards and led the nation with an average of 11.51 rushing yards per carry.

Four Army players were consensus first-team picks on the 1945 All-America college football team: Blanchard; Davis; tackle Tex Coulter; and guard John Green. In a departure from normal practice, the Newspaper Enterprise Association (NEA) named all eleven Army starters as its All-American team for 1945. Other notable players included quarterback Arnold Tucker (NEA) and end Hank Foldberg.

The undefeated 1946 Army team was one of the strongest of all time, as during World War II, loose player transfer rules allowed service academies to assemble many of the nation's best players.

Schedule

Personnel

Players
 Shelton Biles, guard
 Doc Blanchard (College Football Hall of Fame), fullback, Bishopville, South Carolina, 6', 208 pounds
 Roland Catarinella, guard
 Bobby Chabot
 Tex Coulter, tackle, San Antonio, Texas, 6'3", 220 pounds
 Glenn Davis (College Football Hall of Fame), Claremont, California, 5'9", 170 pounds
 Hank Foldberg, end, Dallas, Texas, 6'1", 195 pounds
 Herschel E. Fuson, Middlesburg, Kentucky, 6'1", 215 pounds
 Arthur L. Gerometta, guard, Gary, Indiana, 5'10", 190 pounds
 John Green (College Football Hall of Fame), guard and captain, Shelbyville, Kentucky, 5'8-1/2", 190 pounds
 Shorty McWilliams, halfback, Meridan, Mississippi, 5'11", 175 pounds
 Albert M. Nemetz, tackle, Prince George, Virginia, 6', 190 pounds
 Dick Pitzer, end, Connellsville, Pennsylvania, 6'1", 195 pounds
 Barney Poole (College Football Hall of Fame), end, Gloster, Mississippi
 Arnold Tucker (College Football Hall of Fame), quarterback, Miami, Florida, 5'9", 175 pounds

Coaches
 Earl Blaik (College Football Hall of Fame), head coach
 Paul Amen, assistant coach
 Andy Gustafson (College Football Hall of Fame), backfield coach
 Herman Hickman (College Football Hall of Fame), line coach
 Stu Holcomb, assistant coach
 Harvey Jablonsky (College Football Hall of Fame), assistant coach
 Bill Bevan, trainer

Awards and honors
 Doc Blanchard, Heisman Trophy
 Doc Blanchard, Maxwell Award
 Doc Blanchard, James E. Sullivan Award

References

Army
Army Black Knights football seasons
College football national champions
Lambert-Meadowlands Trophy seasons
College football undefeated seasons
Army Cadets football